The Army Black Knights football statistical leaders are individual statistical leaders of the Army Black Knights football program in various categories, including passing, rushing, receiving, total offense, defensive stats, and kicking. Within those areas, the lists identify single-game, single-season, and career leaders. The Black Knights represent the United States Military Academy (often informally known as "West Point") as an independent in the NCAA's Division I Football Bowl Subdivision (FBS).

Although Army began competing in intercollegiate football in 1890, the school's official record book considers the "modern era" to have begun in 1944. Records from before this year are often incomplete and inconsistent, and they are generally not included in these lists.

These lists are dominated by more recent players for several reasons:
 Since 1944, seasons have increased from 10 games to 11 and then 12 games in length.
 The NCAA didn't allow freshmen to play varsity football until 1972 (with the exception of the World War II years), allowing players to have four-year careers.
 Bowl games only began counting toward single-season and career statistics in 2002. The Black Knights have played in four bowl games since then: the Armed Forces Bowl in 2010, 2017, and 2018, plus the game now known as the First Responder Bowl in 2016, allowing the players to accumulate statistics for an extra game in those seasons.

However, values on these lists are often smaller than the values seen on other programs' lists for several reasons:
 Like the other service academies (with the Air Force and Naval Academies also playing FBS football), West Point is a four-year undergraduate program that normally does not redshirt players. This means that for a player to play for four years, he must be good enough to see the field as a true freshman. Relatively few players are prepared to do this, which depresses career records.
 In the modern era, the Black Knights have traditionally run an option offense that emphasizes running, including by the quarterbacks. However, Army ran a pro-style offense in the 1970s and the early 2000s, and passing and receiving records tend to belong to players from those eras.

These lists are updated through Army's game against Rice on August 30, 2019.

Passing

Passing yards

Passing touchdowns

Rushing

Rushing yards

Rushing touchdowns

Receiving

Receptions

Receiving yards

Receiving touchdowns

Total offense
Total offense is the sum of passing and rushing statistics. It does not include receiving or returns.

Total offense yards

Touchdowns responsible for
"Touchdowns responsible for" is the NCAA's official term for combined passing and rushing touchdowns.

Defense

Interceptions

Tackles

Sacks

Kicking

Field goals made

Field goal percentage

References

Lists of college football statistical leaders by team